The "Guerrillas' Song" is a Chinese patriotic song from the Second Sino-Japanese War (called The War of Resistance Against Japan both in ROC and PRC).

The song describes the guerrilla (i.e. the Chinese resistance) fighters in China during the Second Sino-Japanese War.  It was written and composed by He Lüting (贺绿汀) in 1937. The melody is adapted from "The British Grenadiers."

The song is also sung in Taiwan.

Lyrics 

Political party songs
Chinese patriotic songs
Songs with music by He Luting